John Anderson Souza Fonseca (born 3 May 1997), commonly known as Anderson or John Anderson, is a Brazilian professional footballer who plays as a forward for Romanian Liga I side Voluntari. In his career, Anderson also played for teams such as Barcelona Esportivo Capela, Leixões or Freamunde.

References

External links
 

1997 births
Living people
Footballers from São Paulo
Brazilian footballers
Association football forwards
Leixões S.C. players
S.C. Freamunde players
Liga I players
FC Voluntari players
Brazilian expatriate footballers
Brazilian expatriate sportspeople in Portugal
Expatriate footballers in Portugal
Brazilian expatriate sportspeople in Romania
Expatriate footballers in Romania